Pomaderris lanigera, commonly known as woolly pomaderris, is a species of flowering plant in the family Rhamnaceae and is endemic to south-eastern continental Australia. It is a shrub or small tree with hairy stems, lance-shaped to egg-shaped or elliptic leaves, and hemispherical clusters of yellow flowers.

Description
The upper surface of the leaves has a few erect hairs and the lower surface is covered with shaggy, rust-coloured, star-shaped hairs. The flowers are yellow with shaggy rust-coloured hairs on the back and are arranged in more or less hemispherical panicles  in diameter. Flowering occurs from August to October.

Taxonomy
Woolly pomaderris was first formally described in 1809 by Henry Cranke Andrews who gave it the name Ceanothus laniger in The Botanist's Repository for New, and Rare Plants. In 1816, John Sims changed the name to Pomaderris lanigera in The Botanical Magazine. The specific epithet (lanigera) means "woolly".

Distribution and habitat
Pomaderris lanigera is widespread in forest on the coast and nearby ranges from south-eastern Queensland through New South Wales to near Melbourne in Victoria.

References

External links
 

Flora of New South Wales
lanigera
Flora of Victoria (Australia)
Flora of Queensland
Taxa named by Henry Cranke Andrews